Fehring is surname. Notable people with the surname include:

Charlie Fehring (1899–1981), Australian rules footballer
Dutch Fehring (1912–2006), American football and baseball player and coach
Jeff Fehring (1955–2008), Australian rules footballer

See also
Fehr